Namalia was first described in 1968 by G. J. B. Germs from an outcrop near Helmeringhausen, Namibia and  Namalia dates back to the Ediacaran Period (579-554 Ma). Namalia has a conical structure and it is thought that it lived semi-buried in sediment along the seafloor.

Description 
Namalia is described as a multi-layered conical fossil, 5.2-9 centimeter in length, that exhibits 27-40 longitudinally corrugated ridges on the outer surface with a blunt apex. In cross section, this genus has a 1.5-7 centimeter oval opening with two layers and septa in between them. Many specimens are deformed indicating that the body was probably soft.

Diversity 
Only one species, Namalia villieriensis, has been discovered so far. But there are multiple other known Nama-type biota, or benthic organisms with the hard parts preserved, that are thought to have lived in similar ecological niches as N. villieriensis.

Discovery 
This species was discovered by G. J. B. Germs in 1963 while he was examining the Nama System in Namibia (Southwest Africa). These fossils were found in an orthoquartzite layer of the Kuibis Series in an area north of Helmeringhausen. Namalia was also found in colonies of up to thirty individuals that were generally perpendicular to the bedding plane of the rock.

Distribution 
Namalia has only ever been found at one other locality besides the orthoquartzite in the Kuibis Series in Namibia. The only other discovered site is located in the June beds in the Sewki Brook Formation in the Mackenzie Mountains in northwest Canada.

Ecology 
Namalia lived in colonies as well as scattered individuals and are interpreted to have occupied shallow to deep waters. The specimens are found filled with sand which was previously thought to have entered the quilts (skeletal structure) after death. The taphonomic scenario is still debated as this scenario leads to a mechanical problem in hydrostatically supported structures. The prevailing hypothesis is that the sand was already in the quilt and that it could have loosely attached to trabecular structures that then disintegrated after death, or that the sand grains may have floated in the protoplasm.

See also 
 List of Ediacaran genera

References 

Ediacaran life